Lieutenant General Sir Edward Barnes,  (28 October 1776 – 19 March 1838) was a British soldier who became governor of Ceylon.

Military career
Barnes joined the 47th Regiment of Foot in 1792 as an ensign, and quickly rose to field rank. He was promoted to lieutenant-colonel in 1807, serving in the Invasion of Martinique in 1809, and colonel in 1810. Two years later, he served on Wellington's staff in the Peninsular War. His services in this capacity gained him further promotion; as a major-general, he led a brigade in the Battle of Vitoria and took part in the battles the Pyrenees, Nivelle, Nive and Orthez. He was awarded the Gold Cross and three clasps for his Peninsula service. Barnes served in the campaign of 1815 as adjutant-general, and was wounded at the Battle of Waterloo, where he was known as "our fire eating adjutant general". Already a KCB, he was a recipient of the Austrian Order of Maria Theresa 3rd Class, and the Russian Order of St Anne. 

In 1808 he was appointed the lieutenant-governor of Dominica serving in the position until 1812, when he was gazetted as lieutenant-governor of Antigua in December 1813, although he did not take up the appointment.

In 1819, his connection with Ceylon began. Lieutenant-General Barnes was appointed acting Governor of Ceylon from 1 February 1820 to 2 February 1822, succeeding Robert Brownrigg. He then served as governor of Ceylon from 18 January 1824 to 13 October 1831, succeeded by Robert Wilmot-Horton (1784–1841, governor 13 to 23 October 1831). He directed the construction of the great military road between Colombo and Kandy, and of many other lines of communication, made the first census of the population, and introduced coffee cultivation based on the West Indian system (1824). In 1831, he received the GCB. From 1832 to 1833, he was commander in-chief in India, with the local rank of general.

On his return home, he was appointed in 1834 Colonel of the 31st (Huntingdonshire) Regiment of Foot, a post he held until his death. The same year he stood for Parliament as Conservative candidate for Sudbury at a by-election. The votes between the two candidates were tied, and the returning officer gave Barnes his casting vote and declared him elected; however, his opponent petitioned against the outcome, denying that the returning officer had the right to a casting vote, and the issue had not been resolved before Parliament was dissolved. At the 1835 general election, Barnes was narrowly defeated, but he finally became MP for Sudbury at the third attempt in 1837; however, he died in the following year.

Along with Admiral William Bowles, Barnes was responsible for the establishment of the Army and Navy Club in Pall Mall, London.

Barnes' portrait was painted, for Ceylon, by John Wood, and a memorial statue was erected in Colombo in front of the President's House, Colombo from which point trunk road mileage was measured in Ceylon.

Personal life
Edward Barnes was born on 28 October 1776, the son of John Barnes and Anne née Parke.

He married Maria Fawkes (1798–1854), of Farnley Hall, on 31 July 1823 in Otley, Yorkshire.

Barnes died on 19 March 1838 at his home in Walthamstow, Essex and is buried in the churchyard of St. Mary's Church, Walthamstow. His gravesite is marked by a large monument, with an inscription giving details of his achievements in life.

See also 
 Raj Bhavan, originally known as the Barnes' Court after Edward Barnes

References

Attribution

External links 
 

1776 births
1838 deaths
British Army lieutenant generals
British Army personnel of the Napoleonic Wars
British Commanders-in-Chief of India
Members of the Parliament of the United Kingdom for English constituencies
UK MPs 1837–1841
Knights Grand Cross of the Order of the Bath
Governors of British Ceylon
Governors of Dominica
47th Regiment of Foot officers
Recipients of the Army Gold Cross
Recipients of the Order of St. Anna, 1st class
General Officers Commanding, Ceylon
Recipients of the Waterloo Medal
Knights Cross of the Military Order of Maria Theresa